Jack and Jill was a British children's comics magazine published by Amalgamated Press/Fleetway/IPC between 27 February 1954 and 29 June 1985, a run of approximately 1,640 issues. In 1955, Jack and Jill absorbed the fellow Amalgamated Press title Playbox (launched in 1925).

The title of the magazine was derived from the nursery rhyme of the same title but the characters Jack and Jill of Buttercup Farm were otherwise unrelated. Jack and Jill of Buttercup Farm was the cover strip for many years, originally drawn by Hugh McNeill and later by Antonio Lupatelli.

The stories of Jack and Jill were related in rhyming couplets, as were a number of other early stories, although by the end of the 1970s the stories were written in normal prose form. Others were told in captions below the illustrations or text comics, a style of storytelling common to pre-war nursery comics such as Puck (published 1904–1940) and The Rainbow (published 1914–1956).

Strips and text comics
 Chalky the Blackboard Boy
 Douglas Dachshund
 The Enchanted House
 Flipper the Skipper / Flipper the Jolly Penguin
 Fliptail the Otter, by Bernard Long
 Freddie Frog
 Fun in Toyland
 Gregory Grasshopper
 Harold Hare
 Jack and Jill of Buttercup Farm
 Jerry, Don and Snooker
 Joe, based on the BBC TV series
 Katie Country Mouse
 Linda and Her Magic Bubble Mixture
 The Magic Roundabout, based on the TV series
 Little Miss, based on the characters created by Roger Hargreaves
 Moonie
 Pinky and Perky, based on the TV series
 Pixie Pip
 Snuggles the Koala Bear
 Teddy and Cuddly
 Tiger Tim and the Bruin Boys
 Toad of Toad Hall, based on The Wind in the Willows story
 Tommy Trouble
 Walter Hottle-Bottle
 The Wombles, based on the BBC TV series

References

Sources 
 

1954 comics debuts
1985 comics endings
Jack and Jill
Jack and Jill
Jack and Jill
Defunct British comics
Magazines established in 1954
Magazines disestablished in 1985
Comic strip duos
Comics characters introduced in 1954
Child characters in comics
British comics characters
Comics about women